The Arrowhead Range is a mountain range  long, situated just north of Cosmonaut Glacier and west of Aviator Glacier in the Southern Cross Mountains of Victoria Land, Antarctica. It was mapped by the United States Geological Survey from surveys and from U.S. Navy air photos, 1960–64. The name was applied by the Advisory Committee on Antarctic Names and alludes to the shape of the eastern end of the range.

Features
Geographical features of Arrowhead Range include:

 Cosmonaut Glacier
 Nathan Hills
 Runaway Hills
 Stewart Heights

References 

Mountain ranges of Victoria Land
Borchgrevink Coast